Pegomya betae is a species of fly in the family Anthomyiidae. It is found in the  Palearctic . For identification see

References

External links
Images representing Pegomyia at BOLD
 Bugguide.net. Species Pegomya betae

Anthomyiidae
Insects described in 1847
Muscomorph flies of Europe